Aryktakh (Arıktaax) is a rural locality (a selo) and the administrative center of Aryktakhsky Rural Okrug of Kobyaysky District in the Sakha Republic, Russia, located  from Sangar, the administrative center of the district. Its population as of the 2010 Census was 286; up from 275 recorded in the 2002 Census.

References

Notes

Sources
Official website of the Sakha Republic. Registry of the Administrative-Territorial Divisions of the Sakha Republic. Kobyaysky District. 

Rural localities in Kobyaysky District